The 1921 Purdue Boilermakers football team was an American football team that represented Purdue University during the 1921 Big Ten Conference football season. In their first season under head coach William Henry Dietz, the Boilermakers compiled a 1–6 record, finished in a tie for eighth place in the Big Ten Conference with a 1–4 record against conference opponents, and were outscored by their opponents by a total of 95 to 9. Edmund R. Carman was the team captain.

Schedule

References

Purdue
Purdue Boilermakers football seasons
Purdue Boilermakers football